Benjamin Hardin Helm (June 2, 1831 – September 21, 1863) was an American politician, attorney, and Confederate brigadier general. A son of Kentucky governor John L. Helm, he was born in Bardstown, Kentucky. He attended the Kentucky Military Institute and the West Point Military Academy and then studied law at the University of Louisville and Harvard University. He served as a state legislator and the state's attorney in Kentucky. Helm was offered the position of Union Army paymaster by his brother-in-law, President Abraham Lincoln (Helm was married to Emilie Todd, the half-sister of Mary Todd Lincoln), a position which he declined. Helm joined the Confederate States Army. As a brigadier general, Helm commanded the 1st Kentucky Brigade, more commonly known as The Orphan Brigade. He died on the battlefield during the Battle of Chickamauga.

Early life

The son of lawyer and politician John L. Helm and Lucinda Barbour Hardin, Benjamin Hardin Helm was born in Bardstown, Kentucky on June 2, 1831. In the winter of 1846, at age 15, Helm enrolled at the Kentucky Military Institute, where he remained for three months. He left on his 16th birthday to accept an appointment at West Point the same day. Helm graduated in 1851 near his 20th birthday, ranked 9th in a class of 42 cadets. He became a brevet second lieutenant in the 2nd U.S. Dragoons. He served at a cavalry school at Carlisle, Pennsylvania, and at Fort Lincoln, Texas, but resigned his commission after a year, when he was diagnosed with inflammatory rheumatism.

Helm then studied law at the University of Louisville and Harvard University, graduating in 1853 and practicing law with his father. In 1855, he was elected to the House of Representatives of Kentucky from Hardin County, and was the state's attorney for the 3rd district of Kentucky from 1856 to 1858. In 1856, Helm married Emilie Todd, a half-sister of Mary Todd Lincoln.

In 1860, he was appointed assistant inspector-general of the Kentucky State Guard, which he was active in organizing. Kentucky remained officially neutral during the American Civil War, but his brother-in-law, now President Abraham Lincoln, offered him the position of paymaster of the Union Army. Helm declined the offer, and returned to Kentucky to raise the 1st Kentucky Cavalry Regiment for the Confederate Army.

Military career
Helm was commissioned a colonel on October 19, 1861, and served under Brigadier General Simon B. Buckner in Bowling Green, Kentucky. Helm and the 1st Kentucky were then ordered south.  He was promoted to brigadier general on March 14, 1862 and, three weeks later, received a new assignment to raise the 3rd Kentucky Brigade, in the division of Major General John C. Breckinridge. During the Battle of Shiloh, Helm used his brigade to guard the Confederate flanks. In 1862, he was also sent to protect the Arkansas, an ironclad warship of the Confederate Navy under construction in Yazoo City, Mississippi. Serving under Breckinridge in January 1863, he was given command of the First Kentucky Brigade, commonly known as the "Orphan Brigade". Helm's brigade was assigned to the Army of Tennessee, where it participated in the 1863 Tullahoma and Chickamauga campaigns. Near the end of the spring of 1863, Breckinridge ordered Helm to deploy the brigade to Vicksburg, Mississippi to participate in General Joseph E. Johnston's unsuccessful attempt to break the siege. Helm called it "the most unpleasant and trying [campaign] of his career".

Battle of Chickamauga and death

In the fall of 1863, the 1st Kentucky Brigade formed a part of General Braxton Bragg's counteroffensive against Union Major General William Rosecrans in Chattanooga, Tennessee. At 9:30 am on September 20, 1863, the divisions of Generals Breckinridge and Patrick Cleburne were ordered to move forward. Helm's brigade and the others in Breckinridge's division drove into the Federals' left. General Cleburne's division, which was intended to strike near the center of the line, was delayed by heavy fire from Union soldiers, leaving the left flank unguarded. Repeated attempts to overwhelm the Federals were in vain, though some of Helm's Kentuckians and Alabamians managed to reach within  of the Federal line. In less than an hour of the order given to advance, fully one third of the Orphan Brigade had been lost. While the remainder of Helm's men clashed with the Union line, a sharpshooter from the 15th Kentucky Union Infantry shot Helm in the chest. Bleeding profusely, he remained in the saddle a few moments before toppling to the ground. After being carried off the battlefield, Helm's surgeons concluded that his wounds would be fatal. Helm clung to life for several hours. Knowing that his health was deteriorating, he asked who had won the battle. When assured that the Confederates had carried the day, he muttered: "Victory!, Victory!, Victory!". On September 21, 1863, Gen. Helm succumbed to his wounds.

Following his death, Abraham Lincoln and his wife went into private mourning at the White House. Mary Lincoln's niece recalled: "She knew that a single tear shed for a dead enemy would bring torrents of scorn and bitter abuse on both her husband and herself." However, the widowed Emilie Todd Helm was granted safe passage to the White House in December 1863.

In an official report of the Battle of Chickamauga, General Daniel Harvey Hill stated that Benjamin Helm's "gallantry and loveliness of character endeared him to everyone." In a letter to Emilie Todd Helm, General Breckinridge said, "Your husband commanded them [the men of the Orphan brigade] like a thorough soldier. He loved them, they loved him, and he died at their head, a patriot and a hero."

See also

List of American Civil War generals (Confederate)

Notes

References

Further reading

External links
 
 
 

Confederate States of America military personnel killed in the American Civil War
Confederate States Army brigadier generals
Members of the Kentucky House of Representatives
People of Kentucky in the American Civil War
United States Military Academy alumni
People from Bardstown, Kentucky
Orphan Brigade
1831 births
1863 deaths
Harvard Law School alumni
LaRue family
19th-century American politicians
University of Louisville alumni
United States Army officers